Tex Taylor may refer to:

Tex Taylor (baseball), American baseball player-manager
Tex Taylor (comics), American Western comic book